Jean-Marie Luton (4 August 1942 - 16 April 2020) was a French aerospace engineer who was the Director General of the European Space Agency from 1990 to 1997. He also served in French space agency CNES and as the head of the aerospace arm of Aérospatiale. He was the Chairman and CEO of Arianespace from 1997 to 2002. He was a member of the International Academy of Astronautics (IAA) and the Association Aéronautique et Astronautique de France (AAAF). He retired in 2007.

Luton was awarded the title of Officer of the Légion d'honneur and Commander of the Ordre national du Mérite. In 1985, he received the Astronautics Prize by the International Academy of Astronautics.

Sources 
 Jean-Marie Luton
 Jean-Marie Luton, 1942-2020

References

1942 births
2020 deaths
People from Chamalières
French aerospace engineers
European Space Agency personnel